Junkyard Dog (born Sylvester Ritter, 1953–1998) was an American professional wrestler.

Junkyard Dog, or its initials JYD may refer to:

People
 Norvell Austin, American professional wrestler, who was using the name years before Ritter.
 Jerome Williams (basketball) (born 1973), former professional basketball player in the NBA
 Dean Laidley (born 1967), Australian rules football player and coach
 Jared Dudley (born 1985), former college basketball player for Boston College where he was originally recognized by that nickname
 DeMarre Carroll (born 1986), American professional basketball player in the NBA
 Stewart Mills III, wealthy businessman and politician, Republican candidate for Minnesota's 8th Congressional district

Other
 The Junkyard Dog, a novel by Robert Wright Campbell

See also
"Bad, Bad Leroy Brown", which prominently mentions the phrase "junkyard dog" in its chorus 
Junkyard (disambiguation)
 Scrapheap Challenge or Junkyard Wars